Auto may refer to:

Vehicles
 An automobile
 An autonomous car
 An auto rickshaw

Mechanisms
 Short for automatic
 An automaton
 An automatic transmission

Media
 Auto (art), a form of Portuguese dramatic play
 Auto (film), 2007 Tamil comedy film
 Auto (play), a subgenre of dramatic literature
 Auto (Israeli magazine), Israel's oldest car magazine since 1986
 Auto (Italian magazine), an Italian magazine and one of the organizers of the European Car of the Year award

Programming keywords
 A keyword in the C programming language used to declare automatic variables
 A keyword in C++11 used for type inference

Fictional characters
 Auto (Mega Man), a character from Mega Man series of games
 AUTO, a fictional robot in the 2008 film WALL-E

Locations
 Auto, West Virginia
 Auto, American Samoa

See also
 Otto